Amelin is a Russian masculine surname, its feminine counterpart is Amelina. Notable people with the surname include:

Anatoly Amelin (born 1946), Soviet table tennis player
Jérémy Amelin (born 1986), French recording artist and entertainer

Russian-language surnames